Kenneth John Ingalls (born 8 March 1987) is a former speedway rider from the United States.

Speedway career
He rode in the top tier of British Speedway for the Wolverhampton Wolves and Swindon Robins during the 2012 Elite League speedway season. He started his British racing career at Workington Comets in 2010.

References 

1987 births
Living people
American speedway riders
Swindon Robins riders
Wolverhampton Wolves riders
Workington Comets riders